Urmas Espenberg (born 4 July 1961) is an Estonian author, politician and publicist, member of the XIV Riigikogu as an alternate member.

Career and education 

In 1984, he graduated from Moscow State University. From 1991 to 1993, he attended Catonsville Community College. He is a member and spokesperson of the Conservative People's Party of Estonia the right-wing populist party in Estonia, and sits on its board.

Political views 
He is quoted as having written on an Estonian National conservative news and opinion portal: "A person's personal life remains. And that life would be safe and pleasant then. Far from it – hordes of low-IQ immigrants and Islamic radicals make it disgusting and downright dangerous by forcing their views and beliefs."

Publications
 Books
"Tequila pööripäev" (Agitaator/Kollane raamat: 2002)
"Otsin naist (2. osa)" (Agitaator/Kollane raamat: 2003)
"Diskreetne passioon: Filosoofiline reality-romaan elust banaanivabariigis" (: 2004)
"Erose kütkeis: Filosoofilis-sotsioloogiline seksuaaluurimus" (: 2005)
"Kestvad kiiduavaldused. Valitud esseed (2004–2006). Intervjuu Rein Veidemanniga" (: 2007)
"Mees, kes kartis" (Kentaur: 2009)
"Mars ja Venus – elu igavene heitlus" (Piip: 2011)
"Rändaja/The Traveller" (Läänetasandiku OÜ: 2013)
"Valge mehe lauaraamat" (Läänetasandiku OÜ: 2017)

 Articles

References

External links

 Kalle Mälberg: Espenbecq ja Houelleberg ehk Lõuna-Eesti rahvuskonservatiivid Kääpa koolisaalis, Uued Uudised, 3 March 2017 (review to his literal works)

1961 births
Estonian male novelists
20th-century Estonian novelists
20th-century male writers
21st-century Estonian politicians
Members of the Riigikogu, 2019–2023
Conservative People's Party of Estonia politicians
Moscow State University alumni
People from Lüganuse Parish
Living people